Premiere (also known as PREM1ERE on air) was the first subscription movie channel launched on 1 September 1984, which broadcasts to Europe via satellite alongside the other services of that time including Sky Channel, Music Box and The Children's Channel.

History

The Entertainment Network
The Entertainment Network – also known as TEN and The Movie Channel – launched on 29 March 1984 by Czechoslovak-born British media proprietor Robert Maxwell, it was jointly owned by UIP Pay TV Group (MGM/UA, Paramount and MCA/Universal), Visionhire, Plessey and The Rank Organisation, which also developed in-house by Rediffusion Cablevision.

The station went bust on 1 June 1985, but was later relaunched as Mirrorvision in the following day.

Mirrorvision
Mirrorvision was a film channel from the stable of the Daily Mirror launched on 2 June 1985, whether Mirrorvision and Premiere were merged but continue to be called from the same name on 1 April 1986.

Star Channel
Star Channel was started by British Telecom in August 1986 as an alternative film service which broadcasts between 6.30pm and 2.00am, it has been distributed to several cable operators on videotape form rather than by satellite.

Discussions on a merger between the film services were begun and concluded with Premiere, Star Channel and Home Video Channel all now being programmed within a reconstructed partnership but the channel continued as a separate service for the time being.

In July 1987, the expected closure of Star Channel took place following its merger with Premiere, thereby reducing the remaining film services to include Bravo and Home Video Channel.

Demise
Due to losses of around £10 million and increased competition from Sky Movies, Premiere closed on 31 July 1989. The final film shown was 1985's Twice in a Lifetime, followed by a final announcement thanking the viewers as well as a few businesses that helped with Premiere's transmission.

Programming
In addition to movies, the service also showed children's television programmes in an after school slot as fillers within the channel premiered ThunderCats before the BBC1 launch, and also the first to show was Jayce and the Wheeled Warriors.

See also
 List of European television stations
 Timeline of cable television in the United Kingdom
 Starview
 The Movie Channel
 Carlton Cinema
 Film4
 Filmnet
 Teleclub
 V Film (formerly TV 1000)

References

External links
 https://web.archive.org/web/20110716201338/http://www2.tv-ark.org.uk/otherchannels/premiere.html
 http://www.dailymotion.com/video/x8u5bt_premiere-family-films-ident-1986_shortfilms#.UdH6E5y-FgE

Defunct television channels in the United Kingdom
Television channels and stations established in 1984
Television channels and stations disestablished in 1989
Movie channels in the United Kingdom
1980s in Europe
1980s in the United Kingdom
1980s in British television
History of television in the United Kingdom